Mantri Ananda Shai (18th Century CE) was royal uncle to Ching-Thang Khomba of Manipur. He was the son of Pamheiba and brother to the usurper Chitsai. He started the Heigru Hidongba festival with his nephew Ching-Thang Khomba.

See also
List of Meitei royals
Manipur (princely state)

External links
Heigru-Hidongba Festival Of Manipur ManipurOnline - 22 September 2002

Shai, Mantri
Hindu monarchs